Pleurorthoceras  is an orthocerid cephalopod from the Upper Ordovician of North America (Ohio, Manit). The shell externally is like that of Michelinoceras in being long and slender with a circular cross section. It differs in having a subcentral siphuncle with somewhat inflated segments.

References
 Sweet, Walter C. 1964. Nautiloidea-Orthocerida. Treatise on Invertebrate Paleontology, Part K. Geological Soc of America and Univ Kansas Press.

Nautiloids
Paleozoic life of the Northwest Territories